Sky King Airport  is a public use airport located five nautical miles (9 km) north of the central business district of Terre Haute, a city in Vigo County, Indiana, United States.

Facilities and aircraft 
It has two asphalt paved runways: 8/26 is 3,557 by 50 feet (1,084 x 15 m) and 18/36 is 1,978 by 50 feet (603 x 15 m).

For the 12-month period ending December 31, 2008, the airport had 23,015 aircraft operations, an average of 63 per day: 95% general aviation and 5% air taxi. At that time there were 39 aircraft based at this airport: 87% single-engine and 13% multi-engine.

References

External links 
 Brown Flying School, flight school and fixed-base operator (FBO)
 Aerial image as of 24 February 1998 from USGS The National Map
 
 

Airports in Indiana
Transportation buildings and structures in Vigo County, Indiana